A smoke test is a method for determining if there is sufficient customer demand for a given value proposition of a product or service to justify building the actual product or service.

This is commonly a one-page website which describes the product and asks the visitor to sign up to the product or service before the product or service is actually available. The customer is unaware that the product or service does not yet exist but must give some form of payment in order to get access.

Payment may be done via cash, cash equivalent, time/attention, or simply data as in the case of requesting an email address to sign up.

History 

The term derives from Eric Ries lean startup methodology and is based on smoke testing in a software context. Instead of testing a software product for early fundamental flaws, a business model is tested for the most common flaw: lack of customer demand.

References

Lean manufacturing